Alles is one of eight parishes (administrative divisions) in Peñamellera Alta, a municipality within the province and autonomous community of Asturias, in northern Spain. The ruined Church of San Pedro de Plecín is in the town. 

Parishes in Peñamellera Alta